Stenseth is a surname. Notable people with the surname include:

Ane Appelkvist Stenseth (born 1996), Norwegian cross-country skier
Dagfinn Stenseth (1936–2019), Norwegian diplomat
Hans Stenseth (1896–1994), Norwegian flautist
Martinus Stenseth (1890–1979), American World War I veteran
Nils Christian Stenseth (born 1949), Norwegian biologist